Sinaballaj is a village and an administrative unit situated in the central plains of Albania's Western Lowlands region. A former rural municipality, it is now part of Tirana County. At the 2015 local government reform it became a subdivision of the municipality Rrogozhinë. The population at the 2011 census was 1,191.

References

Administrative units of Rrogozhinë
Former municipalities in Tirana County
Villages in Tirana County